The 8th Chess Olympiad, organised by the Fédération Internationale des Échecs (FIDE), comprised an open tournament, as well as a Women's World Championship contest.

Following the end of the 8th Olympiad, the Chess Olympiad was suspended indefinitely due to economic concerns in conjunction with World War II; the next Chess Olympiad would not be held until 1950.

Background

There was a record number of entries, with twenty-seven teams taking part. This compared with the nineteen nations participating at the previous Olympiad; the substantial increase being mostly due to the interest shown by other Central and South American nations, including Cuba, led by former World Champion José Raúl Capablanca on the top board.

Due to certain political events, prominent Austrian players Erich Eliskases and Albert Becker were playing under the German flag and official sources referred to the Czechoslovak team as 'Bohemia & Moravia'. Two of the teams that did not compete were those that finished first and second at Stockholm, namely the United States and Hungary. Indeed, some nations found the cost of sending a team such a distance for a lengthy period prohibitively expensive.

Following the Preliminaries, the teams were split into Final Group A or Final Group B, with the former contesting the Hamilton-Russell Cup and the latter playing for the 'Copa Argentina', a consolation trophy presented by the Argentine President.

Preliminaries

The preliminaries were played from August 21–31, 1939. There were three groups of 7 teams and a group of 6. From a round-robin format, the top four in each group then went forward to Final A, the remainder to Final B. Group winners were Bohemia & Moravia (tied with Poland, Group 1), Latvia (Group 2), Argentina (Group 3) and Sweden (Group 4).

Finals

The finals commenced on September 1, the very date of the outbreak of World War II. This led to much confusion amongst the European teams, although most players wanted to continue. The England team, despite having qualified for Final A, were the only team to return home immediately and their place was not filled. Three of five English representatives: Conel Hugh O'Donel Alexander, Stuart Milner-Barry, and Harry Golombek were soon recruited into Bletchley Park, the British codebreaking centre during World War II.

Concerning the remaining delegations, a crisis assembly was called to vote on how to proceed; this comprised team captains, the hosts and organisers. Leading roles were reportedly taken by World Champion Alexander Alekhine (France), Savielly Tartakower (Poland), Albert Becker (Germany) and the president of the Argentine Chess Federation, Augusto de Muro. The verdict was to continue with the Olympiad.

The political ramifications continued, however, when it became apparent that six of the scheduled finals matches could not be played due to tensions aroused by the war. After considerable deliberation and negotiation, a total of six matches (GER-POL, GER-FRA, GER-PAL, B&M-POL, B&M-FRA, and ARG-PAL) were declared drawn 2–2 by mutual forfeit and this allowed the remainder of the competition to be played out to a conclusion.

Aftermath

At the conclusion of events, many participants decided to stay in Argentina or moved elsewhere in South America, rather than face an uncertain future by returning to a Europe in the midst of war. The players affected included Miguel Najdorf, Paulino Frydman, Gideon Ståhlberg, Erich Eliskases, Paul Michel, Ludwig Engels, Albert Becker, Heinrich Reinhardt, Jiří Pelikán, Karel Skalička, Markas Luckis, Movsas Feigins, Ilmar Raud, Moshe Czerniak, Meir Rauch, Victor Winz, Aristide Gromer, Franciszek Sulik, Adolf Seitz, Chris De Ronde, John Francis O'Donovan, Zelman Kleinstein, Sonja Graf and Paulette Schwartzmann. Most of them were Jewish and had come to Buenos Aires in August 1939 on the Belgian steamer "Piriapolis". The ship has therefore come to be regarded as the epitome of Noah's Ark for a generation of chess players. Significantly, all five members of the German team (Eliskases, Michel, Engels, Becker, Reinhardt) also chose not to return to Nazi Germany.

Results

Final A

{| class="wikitable"
! # !!Country !!Players !! Points
|-
| style="background:gold;"|1 ||  || Eliskases, Michel, Engels, Becker, Reinhardt || 36  
|-
| style="background:silver;"|2 ||  || Tartakower, Najdorf, Frydman, Regedziński, Sulik || 35½
|-
| style="background:#cc9966;"|3 ||  || Keres, Raud, Schmidt, Friedemann, Türn || 33½
|-
| 4 ||  || Ståhlberg, Lundin, Bergkvist, Danielsson, Ekenberg || 33
|-
| 5 ||  || Grau, Piazzini, Bolbochán Jac., Guimard, Pleci || 32½
|-
| 6 ||  || Opočenský, Foltys, Pelikán, Skalička, Zíta || 32
|-
| 7 ||  || Petrovs, Apšenieks, Feigins, Endzelīns, Melngailis || 31½
|-
| 8 ||  || van Scheltinga, Cortlever, De Groot, Prins, De Ronde || 30½
|-
| 9 ||  || Czerniak, Foerder, Winz, Kleinstein, Rauch  || 26
|-
| 10 ||  || Alekhine, Gromer, Kahn, Rometti, Dez|| 24½
|-
| 11 ||  || Capablanca, López, Alemán, Blanco, Planas  || 22½
|-
| 12 ||  || Castillo, Flores, Letelier, Salas Romo, Reed || 22
|-
| 13 ||  || Mikėnas, Vaitonis, Luckis, Tautvaišas, Andrašiūnas || 22
|-
| 14 ||  || Trompowsky, Silva Rocha, Cruz W., Souza Mendes, Cruz Filho  || 21
|-
| 15 ||  || Enevoldsen, Poulsen, Christensen, Sørensen, Larsen || 17½
|-
| 16 ||  || Alexander, Thomas, Milner-Barry, Golombek, Wood || -
|}

Prizes for best individual performances (based on results in the final only) went to:

 Board 1:  José Raúl Capablanca 8½ / 11 = 77.3%
 Board 2:  Miguel Najdorf (9/12) = 75.0%
 Board 3:  Ludwig Engels 9½ / 11 = 86.4%
 Board 4:  Gunnar Friedemann 10 / 13 = 76.9%
 Reserve:  Isaías Pleci 9½ / 13 = 73.1%

Final B

{| class="wikitable"
! # !!Country !!Players !! Points
|-
| 17 ||  || Möller, Ásgeirsson, Guðmundsson, Thorvaldsson, Arnlaugsson || 28
|-
| 18 ||  || Morrison, Yanofsky, Opsahl, Holowach, Helman ||  28
|-
| 19 ||  || Rojahn, Larsen, Rebnord, Austbø ||  27
|-
| 20 ||  || Rotunno, Hounie Fleurquin, Gulla, Roux Cabral, Olivera ||  26
|-
| 21 ||  || Tsvetkov, Neikirch, Kiprov,  Kantardzhiev, Karastoichev ||  25½
|-
| 22 ||  || Ponce, Morales, Sierra, Suarez Dávila, Ayala ||  21
|-
| 23 ||  || Vassaux, Asturias, Cruz Bulnes, Salazar ||  15½
|-
| 24 ||  || O'Hanlon, O'Donovan, Kerlin, Minnis, Nash ||  15½
|-
| 25 ||  || Ismodes, Pinzón Solis, Castro de Mendoza, Soto, Cayo ||  14
|-
| 26 ||  || Cordova, Baender, Rodríguez Hurtado, Zavala, Reyes Velasco ||  10
|-
| 27 ||  || Díaz Pérez, Espínola, Laterza, Boettner, Aponte ||  9½
|}

Prizes for best individual performances (based on results in the final only) went to:

 Board 1:  Ernst Rojahn
 Board 2:  Daniel Yanofsky
 Board 3:  Jón Guðmundsson
 Board 4:  Mikhail Kantardzhiev
 Reserve:  Guðmundur Arnlaugsson

Team results

Group 1

Group 2

Group 3

Group 4

Final A

 Matches in italics in black have not been played.

Final B

Notes

References
8th Chess Olympiad: Buenos Aires 1939 OlimpBase
Chess Olympiads, Arpad Foldeak (Corvina Press, 1966) – pp. 160–180
 Pawns in a Greater Game: The Buenos Aires Chess Olympiad, August–September 1939.

08
Olympiad 08
Chess Olympiad 08
Olympiad 08
Chess Olympiad 08
1930s in Buenos Aires
International chess competitions hosted by Argentina
August 1939 sports events
September 1939 sports events